Queer is an umbrella term for people who are not heterosexual or cisgender. Beginning in the late 1980s, queer activists, such as the members of Queer Nation, began to reclaim the word as a deliberately provocative and politically radical alternative to the more assimilationist branches of the LGBT community.

In the 21st century, queer became increasingly used to describe a broad spectrum of non-normative sexual or gender identities and politics. Academic disciplines such as queer theory and queer studies share a general opposition to binarism, normativity, and a perceived lack of intersectionality, some of them only tangentially connected to the LGBT movement. Queer arts, queer cultural groups, and queer political groups are examples of modern expressions of queer identities.

Critics of the use of the term include members of the LGBT community who associate the term more with its colloquial, derogatory usage, those who wish to dissociate themselves from queer radicalism, and those who see it as amorphous and trendy. Queer is sometimes expanded to include any non-normative sexuality, including cisgender queer heterosexuality, although some LGBTQ people view this use of the term as appropriation.

Origins and early use 
Entering the English language in the  century, queer originally meant "strange", "odd", "peculiar", or "eccentric". It might refer to something suspicious or "not quite right", or to a person with mild derangement or who exhibits socially inappropriate behaviour. The Northern English expression "there's nowt so queer as folk", meaning "there is nothing as strange as people", employs this meaning. Related meanings of queer include a feeling of unwellness or something that is questionable or suspicious. In the 1922 comic monologue "My Word, You Do Look Queer", the word is taken to mean "unwell".  The expression "in Queer Street" is used in the United Kingdom for someone in financial trouble. Over time, queer acquired a number of meanings related to sexuality and gender, from narrowly meaning "gay or lesbian" to referring to those who are "not heterosexual" to referring to those who are either not heterosexual or not cisgender (those who are LGBT+).

Early pejorative use 
By the late 19th century, queer was beginning to gain a connotation of sexual deviance, used to refer to feminine men or men who were thought to have engaged in same-sex relationships. An early recorded usage of the word in this sense was in an 1894 letter by John Sholto Douglas, 9th Marquess of Queensberry.

Queer was used in mainstream society by the 20th century, along with fairy and faggot, as a pejorative term to refer to men who were perceived as flamboyant. This was, as historian George Chauncey notes, "the predominant image of all queers within the straight mind".

Starting in the underground gay bar scene in the 1950s, then moving more into the open in the 1960s and 1970s, the homophile identity was gradually displaced by a more radicalized gay identity. At that time gay was generally an umbrella term including lesbians, as well as gay-identified bisexuals and transsexuals; gender-nonconformity, which had always been an indicator of gayness, also became more open during this time. During the endonymic shifts from invert to homophile to gay, queer was usually pejoratively applied to men who were believed to engage in receptive or passive anal or oral sex with other men as well as those who exhibited non-normative gender expressions.

Early 20th-century queer identity 

In the late 19th and early 20th centuries, queer, fairy, trade, and gay signified distinct social categories within the gay male subculture. In his book Gay New York, Chauncey noted that queer was used as a within-community identity term by men who were stereotypically masculine. Many queer-identified men at the time were, according to Chauncey, "repelled by the style of the fairy and his loss of manly status, and almost all were careful to distinguish themselves from such men", especially because the dominant straight culture did not acknowledge such distinctions. Trade referred to straight men who would engage in same-sex activity; Chauncey describes trade as "the 'normal men' [queers] claimed to be."

In contrast to the terms used within the subculture, medical practitioners and police officers tended to use medicalized or pathological terms like "invert", "pervert", "degenerate", and "homosexual".

None of the terms, whether inside or outside of the subculture, equated to the general concept of a homosexual identity, which only emerged with the ascension of a binary (heterosexual/homosexual) understanding of sexual orientation in the 1930s and 1940s. As this binary became embedded into the social fabric, queer began to decline as an acceptable identity in the subculture.

Similar to the earlier use of queer, gay was adopted by many U.S. assimilationist men in the mid-20th century as a means of asserting their normative status and rejecting any associations with effeminacy. The idea that queer was a pejorative term became more prevalent among younger gay men following World War II. As the gay identity became more widely adopted in the community, some men who preferred to identify as gay began chastising older men who still referred to themselves as queer by the late 1940s:

In calling themselves gay, a new generation of men insisted on the right to name themselves, to claim their status as men, and to reject the "effeminate" styles of the older generation. [...] Younger men found it easier to forget the origins of gay in the campy banter of the very queens whom they wished to reject.In other parts of the world, particularly England, queer continued to be the dominant term used by the community well into the mid-twentieth century, as noted by historical sociologist Jeffrey Weeks:By the 1950s and 1960s to say "I am queer" was to tell of who and what you were, and how you positioned yourself in relation to the dominant, "normal" society. … It signaled the general perception of same-sex desire as something eccentric, strange, abnormal, and perverse.

Reclamation

General

Beginning in the late 1980s, the label queer began to be reclaimed from its pejorative use as a neutral or positive self-identifier by LGBT people. An early example of this usage by the LGBT community was by an organisation called Queer Nation, which was formed in March 1990 and circulated an anonymous flier at the New York Gay Pride Parade in June 1990 titled "Queers Read This". The flier included a passage explaining their adoption of the label queer:

Queer people, particularly queer people of color, began to reclaim queer in response to a perceived shift in the gay community toward liberal conservatism, catalyzed by Andrew Sullivan's 1989 piece in The New Republic, titled Here Comes the Groom: The Conservative Case for Gay Marriage. The queer movement rejected causes viewed as assimilationist, such as marriage, military inclusion and adoption. This radical stance and rejection of U.S. imperialism continued the tradition of earlier lesbian and gay anti-war activism, and solidarity with a variety of leftist movements, such as seen in the positions taken at the first two National Marches on Washington in 1979 and 1987,  the radical direct action of groups like ACT UP, and the historical importance of events like the Stonewall riots. The radical queer groups following in this tradition of LGBT activism contrasted firmly with, "the holy trinity of marriage, military service and adoption [which had] become the central preoccupation of a gay movement centered more on obtaining straight privilege than challenging power." Commentators noted that it was exactly these "revolting queers" (who were now being pushed aside) who had made it safe for the assimilationists to now have the option of assimilation.

Other usage
The term may be capitalized when referring to an identity or community, rather than as an objective fact describing a person's desires, in a construction similar to the capitalized use of Deaf. The 'Q' in extended versions of the LGBT acronym, such as LGBTQIA+, is most often considered an abbreviation of queer. It can also stand for questioning.

Criticism
Reclamation and use of the term queer is controversial; several people and organizations, both LGBT and non-LGBT, object to some or all uses of the word for various reasons. Some LGBT people dislike the use of queer as an umbrella term because they associate it with political radicalism; they say that deliberate use of the epithet queer by political radicals has, in their view, played a role in dividing the LGBT community by political opinion, class, gender, age, and other factors. The controversy about the word also marks a social and political divide in the LGBT community between those (including civil-rights activists) who perceive themselves as "normal" and who wish to be seen as ordinary members of society and those who see themselves as separate, confrontational and not part of the ordinary social order.
Other LGBT people disapprove of reclaiming or using queer because they consider it offensive, derisive or self-deprecating because use by heterosexuals as a pejorative continues to this day, and some LGBT people avoid queer because they perceive it as faddish slang, or alternatively as academic jargon.

Scope

Intersex and queer identities

Scholars and activists have proposed different ways in which queer identities apply or do not apply to intersex people. Sociologist Morgan Holmes and bioethicists Morgan Carpenter and Katrina Karkazis have documenting a heteronormativity in medical rationales for the surgical normalization of infants and children born with atypical sex development, and Holmes and Carpenter have described intersex bodies as queer bodies. In "What Can Queer Theory Do for Intersex?" Iain Morland contrasts queer "hedonic activism" with an experience of insensate post-surgical intersex bodies to claim that "queerness is characterized by the sensory interrelation of pleasure and shame".

Emi Koyama describes a move away from a queer identity model within the intersex movement:

Such tactic [of reclaiming labels] was obviously influenced by queer identity politics of the 1980s and 90s that were embodied by such groups as Queer Nation and Lesbian Avengers. But unfortunately, intersex activists quickly discovered that the intersex movement could not succeed under this model. For one thing, there were far fewer intersex people compared to the large and visible presence of LGBT people in most urban centers. For another, activists soon realized that most intersex individuals were not interested in building intersex communities or culture; what they sought were professional psychological support to live ordinary lives as ordinary men and women and not the adoption of new, misleading identity. ... To make it worse, the word "intersex" began to attract individuals who are not necessarily intersex, but feel that they might be, because they are queer or trans. ... Fortunately, the intersex movement did not rely solely on queer identity model for its strategies.

Queer heterosexuality

Queer is sometimes expanded to include any non-normative sexuality, including (cisgender) "queer heterosexuality". This has been criticized by some LGBTQ people, who argue that queer can only be reclaimed by those it has been used to oppress: "A straight person identifying as queer can feel like choosing to appropriate the good bits, the cultural and political cachet, the clothes and the sound of gay culture, without ... the internalized homophobia of lived gay experience." Many queer people believe that “you don’t have to identify as queer if you’re on the LGBTQIA+ spectrum, but you do have to be on the LGBTQIA+ spectrum to identify as queer.”

Academia

In academia, the term queer and the related verb queering broadly indicate the study of literature, discourse, academic fields, and other social and cultural areas from a non-heteronormative perspective. It often means studying a subject against the grain from the perspective of gender studies.

Queer studies is the study of issues relating to sexual orientation and gender identity usually focusing on LGBT people and cultures. Originally centered on LGBT history and literary theory, the field has expanded to include the academic study of issues raised in biology, sociology, anthropology, history of science, philosophy, psychology, sexology, political science, ethics, and other fields by an examination of the identity, lives, history, and perception of queer people. Organizations such as the Irish Queer Archive attempt to collect and preserve history related to queer studies.

Queer theory is a field of post-structuralist critical theory that emerged in the early 1990s out of the fields of queer studies and women's studies. Applications of queer theory include queer theology and queer pedagogy. Queer theorists, including Rod Ferguson, Jasbir Puar, Lisa Duggan, and Chong-suk Han, critique the mainstream gay political movement as allied with neoliberal and imperialistic agendas, including gay tourism, gay and trans military inclusion, and state- and church-sanctioned marriages for monogamous gay couples. Puar, a queer theorist of color, coined the term homonationalism, which refers to the rise of American exceptionalism, nationalism, white supremacy, and patriarchy within the gay community catalyzed in response to the September 11 attacks. Many studies have acknowledged the problems that lie within the traditional theory and process of social studies, and so choose to utilise a queer theoretical approach instead. One such study was conducted in Melbourne in 2016 by Roffee and Waling. By using queer and feminist theories and approaches the researchers were better equipped to cater for the needs, and be accommodating for the vulnerabilities, of the LGBTIQ participants of the study. In this case, it was a specifically post-modern queer theory that enabled the researchers to approach the study with a fair perspective, acknowledging all the varieties of narratives and experiences within the LGBTIQ community.

Culture and politics
Several LGBT social movements around the world use the identifier queer, such as the Queer Cyprus Association in Cyprus and the Queer Youth Network in the United Kingdom. In India, pride parades include Queer Azaadi Mumbai and the Delhi Queer Pride Parade. The use of queer and Q is also widespread in Australia, including national counselling and support service Qlife and QNews.

Other social movements exist as offshoots of queer culture or combinations of queer identity with other views. Adherents of queer nationalism support the notion that the LGBT community forms a distinct people due to their unique culture and customs. Queercore (originally homocore) is a cultural and social movement that began in the mid-1980s as an offshoot of punk expressed in a do-it-yourself style through zines, music, writing, art and film.

The term queer migration is used to describe the movement of LGBTQ people around the world often to escape discrimination or ill treatment due to their orientation or gender expression. Organizations such as the Iranian Railroad for Queer Refugees and Rainbow Railroad attempt to assist individuals in such relocations.

Art
The label queer is often applied to art movements, particularly cinema. New Queer Cinema was a movement in queer-themed independent filmmaking in the early 1990s. Modern queer film festivals include the Melbourne Queer Film Festival and Mardi Gras Film Festival (run by Queer Screen) in Australia, the Mumbai Queer Film Festival in India, the Asian Queer Film Festival in Japan, and Queersicht in Switzerland. Chinese film director Cui Zi'en titled his 2008 documentary about homosexuality in China Queer China, which premiered at the 2009 Beijing Queer Film Festival after previous attempts to hold a queer film festival were shut down by the government.

Multidisciplinary queer arts festivals include the Outburst Queer Arts Festival Belfast in Northern Ireland, the Queer Arts Festival in Canada, and the National Queer Arts Festival in the United States.

Television shows that use queer in their titles include the UK series Queer as Folk and its American-Canadian remake of the same name, Queer Eye, and the cartoon Queer Duck.

See also 
 Gay Shame
 Heterosexism
 Homophobia
 Queers (TV series)
 Sexual minority
 Sexuality and gender identity-based cultures
 Queerplatonic relationship

References

Citations

General bibliography

External links

 The Gay, Lesbian, Bisexual, Transgender Historical Society

 

1980s neologisms
English words
LGBT terminology
LGBT-related slurs